The Rowghat Mines contain the largest iron ore deposits in Chhattisgarh, India, after the Bailadila Iron Ore Mine. Rowghat Mines' reserves have been assessed at 731.93 Mn tonnes. Bailadila has reserves assessed at 1.343 Bn tonnes. Iron ore deposits in Rowghat were discovered in 1899 and in 1949 Geological Survey of India investigated the area.

Location and approach

Location
Rowghat iron ore deposits are located in the Antagarh Tahsil of Kanker district of Chhattisgarh state.

The area of deposits is covered in Topo sheet No. - 65 E/1. It lies between longitude - 81°03' to 81°14' and latitude - 19°45'30" to 19°58'.

Approach

The stretch of state highway SH-9 (Antagarh–Narayanpur–Kondagaon Road) passes through the Rowghat area and connects it with National Highway 43 at Kondagaon located at about 50 km distance.

Dalli Rajhara–Jagdalpur rail line
Dalli Rajhara–Jagdalpur line has been proposed which, in Phase 1, would connect Rowghat to Dalli Rajhara. Construction of the section from Dalli Rajhara to Rowghat of the rail line is currently underway amid threat from Naxalites and other challenges.

Reserve volumes
Iron ore is spread over 6 deposits. Iron ore occurs in the form of hematite and sometimes as magnetite, goethite, specularite etc.

Rowghat iron ore deposits reserves have been assessed at 731.93 Mn tonnes.

Deposit blocks D and F account for major share - A Block (8.06 Mn tonnes), B Block: (10.80 Mn tonnes), C Block: (55.22 Mn tonnes), D Block: (167.00 Mn tonnes), E Block: (14.40 Mn tonnes), F Block: (476.45 Mn tonnes). Media reports peg the iron ore reserve in F Block at 511 Mn tonnes.

Deposits A to E are under free hold and a number of PL (Prospecting License)/ ML (Mining License) applications have been made to the authorities. Deposit Block F has been allocated to SAIL.

Classification of area
The Rowghat deposits lie in Zone 2 being the north–south trending liner belt in Central India as per classification by Geological Survey of India. The proposed area has been notified by the Government of Chhattisgarh Vide MRD Notification No.F7-13/20/10/12 and F7-16/2007/12, dated 08.04.2010 published in the Chhattisgarh Gazette, dated 23.04.2010, pages 382–384. The deposit area falls within forest land.

Grade of iron ore
Fe content varies in the various blocks - A Block (62.58% Fe), B Block (50.29% Fe), C Block (57.00% Fe), D Block (60.00% Fe), E Block (52.93% Fe),and F Block (59.62% Fe).

Mining and environment issues
The deposit area falls within forest land hence specific clearances from Ministry of Environment and Forests (MoEF) and Chhattisgarh state forest department are required to be taken prior to undertaking any mining activities.

SAIL made its first application in 1983 for Rowghat mines and after 13 years in 1996, the MoEF granted in principle environmental clearance.

In 2004 the MoEF asked SAIL to submit fresh application for forestry and environment clearance. SAIL, after conducting studies by IBM, Central Mines and Research Institute, Zoological Survey of India, National Environmental Engineering Research Institute and others, submitted the application in 2006. After the government of Chhattisgarh forwarded SAIL’s proposal for forestry clearance in May 2007 to the MoEF, the ministry referred it to the empowered committee of the Supreme Court in around June 2007.

In relation to SAIL application for undertaking mining activities in Block F of the Rowghat deposits allocated to it, the Supreme Court Committee gave its final consent for forestry clearance during October 2008. The Supreme Court ruling was followed by final clearance from MoEF to SAIL with certain conditions requiring that SAIL would not set up beneficiation plant and tailing dam at Rowghat and would confine its activities only to mining, primary and secondary crushing in order to reduce the damage to flora and fauna.

Pursuant to which the Mineral Resources Department of Chhattisgarh government finally in October 2009 granted mining lease for F Block of Rowghat Mines to SAIL for a period of 20 years after getting the due Environmental Clearance and Forestry Clearance from the MoEF.

SAIL would now have to transport the iron-ore to its beneficiation plant at Dalli Rajhara located about 90 km from Rowghat resulting in increased capital cost as well as the operating cost.

Opposition to mining activities
Maoist spokesperson Gudsa Usendi reportedly said during an interview in May 2011, that they were categorically opposed to mining operations in Rowghat. He is quoted as having said -  "They [the establishment] are trying to squeeze us. The Rowghat mountains are very important to the ecology of the area and the Maria tribes who live there,”. He is further quoted as having said -"The adivasis did not benefit from the mines in Dalli and they will not benefit from mines in Rowghat

References

Mining in Chhattisgarh
Iron ore mining in India
Kanker district